Louise-Justine Messiaen (née Delbos; 2 November 1906 – 22 April 1959), more commonly known under her pseudonym Claire Delbos, was a French violinist and composer, and first wife of the composer Olivier Messiaen.

Biography 
Delbos was born in Paris, the daughter of a Sorbonne professor, Victor Delbos. Although she was usually known after her marriage as Claire or as Claire-Louise, she was baptized Louise Justine Delbos. She was a pupil at the Schola Cantorum, a private music school in Paris, and later studied violin and composition at the Paris Conservatoire.

Her skill on the violin brought her to the attention of the young Messiaen. They gave recitals together in Paris in the early 1930s, and were married on 22 June 1932. The composer Claude Arrieu was Delbos's bridesmaid. Messiaen wrote the Thème et variations for violin and piano as a wedding gift for his wife; they performed it together on 22 November 1932.

During that summer, the Messiaens moved into an apartment at 77 rue des Plantes, on the Left Bank in the 14th arrondissement of Paris. This was to be their home for the next six years, and was the venue of occasional musical gatherings of select friends; it was where they first met the Jolivets. Some of Messiaen's works were written to celebrate the happiness of the young couple, an example being the song cycle Poèmes pour Mi for soprano and piano in 1936, which he arranged for soprano and orchestra in 1937, and which was based on his own poems about the joy of marriage. Mi was Messiaen's affectionate nickname for Delbos. Delbos also composed several organ works, including Paraphrase sur le jugement dernier and L'offrande à Marie, for Messiaen.

In the early years of their marriage, several of the Messiaens' holidays were spent at the Château St Benoît, in Neussargues-Moissac – a château, owned by the Delbos family, which Messiaen found conducive to composing, and where much of L'Ascension was written. The successful Thème et variations was followed by another violin work written by Messiaen for his wife – Fantaisie, though this was not published until 2007 or 2008, and it is not clear if it was ever performed in public during Messiaen's lifetime.

Delbos suffered a series of miscarriages in the early years of her marriage, but in 1937 their son Pascal was born, and Messiaen produced another song cycle, Chants de terre et de ciel (1938), in which all three members of the family were portrayed. The Messiaens moved into 13 villa du Danube in the 19th arrondissement. Towards the end of the war, Delbos had an operation that resulted in cerebral atrophy, after which she began to suffer from total amnesia. She entered a sanatorium, and remained institutionalized, with steadily declining health, for the rest of her life. She died in 1959, in Hauts-de-Seine.

Compositions 
Songs (for voice and piano):
Primevère (1935) (five songs on poems by Cécile Sauvage, Messiaen's mother):
Le long de mes genoux
J'ai peur d'être laide
Mais je suis belle d'être aimée
Je suis née à l'amour
Dans ma robe à bouquets bleus
L'âme en bourgeon (1937) (eight songs on poems written by Cécile Sauvage on the birth of her son Olivier):
Dors
Mon coeur revient à son printemps
Je suis là
Te voilà hors de l'alvéole
Je savais que ce serait toi
Maintenant il est né
Te voilà mon petit amant
Ai-je pu t'appeler de l'ombre
Trois aspects de la mort (first performed in 1947):
Sans espérance (Cécile Sauvage)
Lamentation et terreur (Book of Job)
Vers elle, avec confiance (R. de Obaldia)

Other vocal
Psalm 141, for soprano, female chorus, four ondes Martenots, and piano. Unpublished.

Organ
Deux pièces (1935)
L'homme né de la femme vit peu de jours
La Vierge berce l'enfant
Paraphrase sur le jugement dernier (1939)
L'offrande à Marie (1943)
Voici la servante du Seigneur
Vierge digne de louanges
Mère des pauvres
Mère toute-joyeuse
Debout, la Mère des douleurs
Secours des Chrétiens, reine de la paix
Parce, Domine 'Pardonnez, Seigneur, à votre peuple', pour le temps de Carême (1952)

See also 
Yvonne Loriod, second wife of Messiaen

Notes

References 
Dingle, Christopher. The Life of Messiaen.
Griffiths, Paul. "Messiaen, Olivier (Eugène Prosper Charles)". Listen Music Online (subscription access) Cambridge University Press, 2007  
Hill, Peter, and Simeone, Nigel. Messiaen. Yale University Press, 2005. ,  
Simeone, Nigel. "Delbos [Messiaen], Claire". Listen Music Online (subscription access)

1906 births
1959 deaths
20th-century French women classical violinists
Schola Cantorum de Paris alumni
French women classical composers
20th-century classical composers
Conservatoire de Paris alumni
Musicians from Paris
20th-century French composers
20th-century women composers